Udhcpc is a very small DHCP client program geared towards embedded systems.  The letters are an abbreviation for Micro - DHCP - Client (μDHCPc). The program tries to be fully functional and RFC 2131 compliant.

It was once packaged with a similarly small DHCP server program named udhcpd, with the package called udhcp.  It is now maintained as part of BusyBox.

Built for uClibc, the client executable is around 18k.

The program accepts all options on the command line, and calls external scripts to handle the configuration of interfaces.

Udhcp was originally developed in 1999 by Matthew Ramsay and distributed under the GNU GPL by Moreton Bay.

External links
BusyBox
Udhcpc

Embedded systems